Love, Peace & Poetry – Vol.7 Mexico is the seventh volume in the Love, Peace & Poetry series released by QDK Media and Normal Records in 2003. This volume explores obscuro garage rock and psychedelic rock bands from Mexico.

Track listing
 "Lost in my World" (Los Dug Dug's) – 4:06
 "Hang Out" (Kaleidoscope) – 2:17
 "Roaming" (La Fachada De Piedra) – 3:07
 "El Ruido del Silencio" (El Tarro De Mostaza) – 3:05
 "Touch Me" (La Vida) – 2:34
 "Joven Amante" (La Libre Expression) – 2:49
 "Behind a Young Girl Smile" (The Flying Carpets) – 2:22
 "En Medio de la Lluvia" (La Revolucion De Emiliano Zapata) – 7:58
 "It's You" (The Spiders) – 4:03
 "Lenon Blues" (Three Souls In My Mind) – 2:46
 "Tommy Lyz" (Toncho Pilatos) – 3:49
 "I'm Dying" (Renaissance) – 3:35
 "The Train" (Ernan Roch) – 4:15
 "Nada Nos Detendra" (Groupo Ciruela) – 3:13
 "Cuando Era Niño" (Los Ovnis) – 2:07
 "The World Is a Bomb" (Survival) – 2:26
 "Volvere" (Nahuatl) – 3:32

Love, Peace & Poetry albums
2003 compilation albums
Garage rock albums by Mexican artists
Psychedelic rock albums by Mexican artists
Compilation albums by Mexican artists